An escape artist is an expert on escapology, the practice of escaping from restraints or other traps.

Escape Artist may also refer to:
Escape Artist Records,  an independent record label formed in 1997
The Escape Artist, a 1982 American film 
The Escape Artist (TV series), a 2013 BBC thriller series
Escape Artist (Garland Jeffreys album) (1981)
Escape Artist (Our Lady Peace album) or Burn Burn (2009)
The Escape Artist (book), 2018 book
 "The Escape Artist" (Star Trek: Short Treks), an episode of Star Trek: Short Treks

See also
 Escape Artists (disambiguation)
The Great Escape Artist, 2011 album by Jane's Addiction